Royal London may refer to:

 Royal London Group, the UK's largest mutual life and pensions company
 Royal London One-Day Cup, a cricket competition sponsored by the above
 Royal London Hospital, a hospital in Whitechapel, London, UK
 Royal London Society for Blind People, a charity based in the UK
 The Royal London Circus, a travelling circus based in Malaysia